Andrew Paul Clements (born 11 October 1955) is an English former footballer who played as a defender. He scored six goals in 152 league appearances in an eight-year career in the Football League with Bolton Wanderers, Port Vale, and York City.

Career
Clements began his career with Bolton Wanderers, who allowed him a two-month loan spell at Roy Sproson's Port Vale in February 1977. He appeared as a substitute on 7 February in a 2–0 defeat to York City at Vale Park, making his full debut four weeks later in a 1–1 draw with Shrewsbury Town at Gay Meadow. In total, he featured in just three Third Division games for the "Valiants" at the end of the 1976–77 season. He played one Second Division game at Burnden Park for Ian Greaves's "Trotters" in the 1977–78 season, before joining Charlie Wright's York City. Having survived a re-election vote, the "Minstermen" finished tenth in the Fourth Division in 1978–79. York then finished in 17th place in 1979–80, before finishing bottom of the Football League in 1980–81 under the stewardship of Barry Lyons. Clements scored eight goals in 163 league and cup games during his four years at Bootham Crescent. He later played in the Northern Counties East League for Rowntree Mackintosh.

Career statistics
Source:

References

1955 births
Living people
People from Swinton, Greater Manchester
English footballers
Association football defenders
Bolton Wanderers F.C. players
Port Vale F.C. players
York City F.C. players
Nestlé Rowntree F.C. players
English Football League players
Northern Counties East Football League players